{{Taxobox
| name = Capsodes gothicus
| image = 
| image_caption =  
| regnum = Animalia
| phylum = Arthropoda
| classis = Insecta
| ordo = Hemiptera
| subordo = Heteroptera
| infraordo = Cimicomomorpha
| superfamilia = Miroidea
| familia = Miridae
| subfamilia = Mirinae
| genus = Capsodes
| species = C. gothicus
| binomial = Capsodes gothicus
| binomial_authority = (Linnaeus, 1758)
| synonyms = 
 Cimex gothicus Linnaeus, 1758
 Capsodes elegans (Reuter, 1896)
 Lopus gothicus elegans Reuter 1896
}}Capsodes gothicus is a species of plant bugs belonging to the family Miridae, subfamily Mirinae. It is found in Europe.

 Similar species Closterotomus cinctipesLiocoris tripustulatus''

References

External links 
 Capsodes gothicus at discoverlife

Bugs described in 1758
Taxa named by Carl Linnaeus
Articles containing video clips
Mirini